Alaa Majid Al-Hashimy (born 1953), is an Iraqi politician. He served as the Iraqi ambassador in Germany, Japan, Spain and Kuwait for over 15 years.

Diplomatic work
Alaa Al-Hashimy was appointed to the "Iraqi Foreign Ministry" and served as:
 Former Iraqi ambassador to Germany
 Former Iraqi ambassador to Japan
 Former Iraqi ambassador to Spain
 Former Iraqi Ambassador to Kuwait

References

External links
 Official Website

Living people
1953 births
People from Baghdad
Ambassadors of Iraq to Kuwait
University of Baghdad alumni